Ganglbauer is a surname. Notable people with the surname include:

Cölestin Josef Ganglbauer (1817–1889), Austrian cardinal
Gerald Ganglbauer (born 1958), Austrian-Australian writer and publisher
Ludwig Ganglbauer (1856–1912), Austrian entomologist